The Bennettsville Historic District is a historic district in Bennettsville, South Carolina, United States that was listed on the National Register of Historic Places in 1978. The original area includes the Magnolia and Jennings-Brown houses, which are separately NRHP-listed.  The NRHP-listed area was increased in 1993 to include the Playhouse Theater and other property along Clyde Street.

References

Historic districts on the National Register of Historic Places in South Carolina
Queen Anne architecture in South Carolina
Beaux-Arts architecture in South Carolina
Geography of Marlboro County, South Carolina
National Register of Historic Places in Marlboro County, South Carolina